Lovey Mary is a 1926 American comedy-drama film directed by King Baggot, with Bessie Love in the title role. It is based on the 1903 novel of the same name by Alice Hegan Rice, a sequel to Rice's Mrs. Wiggs of the Cabbage Patch. It was distributed by Metro-Goldwyn-Mayer.

The film survives, but is incomplete.

Plot 
Lovey Mary (Love) runs away from an orphanage with Tommy (Combs) so that he will not have to return to his bad mother. Lovey and Tommy stay at the home of Miss Hazey (Ogden), who is about to marry a man whom she knows only from correspondence.

Billy Wiggs (Haines) lives next door, and Lovey works with his sisters in a factory to earn money for herself and Tommy. On the day of Miss Hazey's wedding, her fiancee recognizes Lovey from the orphanage and reveals her true identity. Lovey and Billy plan to marry and adopt Tommy.

Cast

Production 
To help her decide whether to participate in the film, MGM lent Bessie Love a copy of the novel Lovey Mary by Alice Hegan Rice in 1925—then-valued at $25. Love never returned the book.

References

External links 
 
 
 
 Production still

1926 films
1926 comedy-drama films
1920s English-language films
American silent feature films
American black-and-white films
Films based on American novels
Films directed by King Baggot
Metro-Goldwyn-Mayer films
Films based on works by Alice Hegan Rice
1920s American films
Silent American comedy-drama films